Gonzalo Celorio Blasco is a writer and an academic and former director of the Fondo de Cultura Económica. Celorio has written two novels, Amor Propio, a coming-of-age story and Y retiemble en sus centros la Tierra.

References

Living people
Year of birth missing (living people)
Members of the Mexican Academy of Language
Mexican literary critics